The American Institute for Economic Research (AIER) is a think tank located in Great Barrington, Massachusetts. It was founded in 1933 by Edward C. Harwood, an economist and investment advisor. It is a 501(c)(3) nonprofit.

History 
Col. Edward C. Harwood was a graduate of the United States Military Academy and served in the Army Corps of Engineers. In the 1920s, he began writing freelance magazine articles on economic issues. With $200 saved from selling his articles, Harwood founded AIER in 1933.

Policy positions 
AIER statements and publications portray the risks of climate change as minor and manageable, with titles such as "What Greta Thunberg Forgets About Climate Change", "The Real Reason Nobody Takes Environmental Activists Seriously" and "Brazilians Should Keep Slashing Their Rainforest".

The institution has also funded research on the comparative benefits that sweatshops supplying multinationals bring to the people working in them.

COVID-19 
AIER issued a statement in October 2020 called the Great Barrington Declaration that argued for a herd immunity strategy of "focused protection" to deal with the COVID-19 pandemic. It was roundly condemned by many public health experts. Anthony Fauci, the infectious disease expert appointed by the White House, called the declaration "total nonsense" and unscientific. Tyler Cowen, a libertarian economist at George Mason University, wrote that while he sympathized with a libertarian approach to deal with the pandemic, he considered the declaration to be dangerous and misguided. The declaration was also criticized by the Niskanen Center, a formerly libertarian think tank that now calls itself moderate.

AIER paid for ads on Facebook promoting its articles against government social distancing measures and mask mandates.

In October 2020, Twitter removed a tweet by White House coronavirus adviser Scott Atlas linking to an AIER article that argued against the effectiveness of masks.

Affiliations 
AIER maintains a global network of local chapters called the Bastiat Society. It partners with the Atlas Network and other groups.

Funding
AIER owns American Investment Services Inc., an investment advisory firm whose fund was valued at around $285 million in 2020. The fund includes holdings in a wide range of companies, but holds a majority of its assets in diversified exchange-traded funds and gold investments. In 2020, about 14% of its investments were in information technology and telecom companies including Microsoft and Alphabet Inc., about 6% in electric and gas utilities, 5% in fossil fuel companies including Chevron and ExxonMobil, and 2% in food, alcohol, and tobacco stocks, including Mondelez International and Philip Morris International.

Over half of AIER's funding comes from its investments, but it also receives contributions and foundation grants. In 2018 it reportedly received US$68,100 from the Charles Koch Foundation, approximately 3% of AIER's revenue for the year. It has partnered with Emergent Order, a public relations company also funded by the Charles Koch Foundation.

In 2019 the American Institute for Economic Research had total assets of $184,901,564.Funding details as of 2019:

See also 
 Misinformation about COVID-19

References

External links 
 Official website

Great Barrington, Massachusetts
Political and economic think tanks in the United States
Economic research institutes
Research institutes in Massachusetts
Libertarian think tanks
Think tanks established in 1933
1933 establishments in Massachusetts